Odysseas Androutsos (1788 – 1825; born Odysseas Verousis ) was a Greek military and political commander in eastern mainland Greece and a prominent figure of the Greek War of Independence.

He grew up in the court of Ali Pasha of Tepelena and was one of his commanders. In 1818 he joined the Greek revolutionary organization Filiki Eteria. After Ali Pasha's defeat, he joined the Greek War of Independence and was distinguished as a commander in the Battle of Gravia Inn in 1821. As a result of the battle, he was appointed military commander of eastern mainland Greece by the Greek revolutionary government. In 1825, after falling out with the rebels, he asked for amnesty from the Imperial court and joined the Ottomans. In a battle near Livadeia, he was captured by the units of the revolutionary army and executed a few days later.  Scholars have variously described him as a hero or a traitor to the Greek cause in the Greek War of Independence. In Greece he is today considered one of the most prominent heroes of the Greek War of Independence, particularly among the left.

Early life
He was born in Ithaca in 1788, his family was from the village of Livanates in Phthiotis prefecture. Androutsos was an Arvanite. His father was Andreas Verousis, a klepht from Livanates, while his mother, Akrivi Tsarlampa was from Preveza.

Ali Pasha era 
After losing his father, Androutsos was taken by Ali Pasha in Ioannina and later became an officer. In Ali's court Androutsos became one of his distinguished Greek military commanders. He also
managed to learn Arvanitika and Italian fluently. Androutsos was soon found in antagonism with Ali's men, as such Ali had ordered his execution but was saved after intervention by Alexis Noutsos. Ali Pasha positioned him as armatolos of Livadeia in eastern central Greece in 1816. In 1818 he became a member of the Filiki Eteria with Athanasios Diakos, an organisation that aimed at the independence of Greece. In 1820, in a local factional dispute he lost his position to Athanasios Diakos. In late 1820, the Ottomans sent an army to remove Ali Pasha from power in Yannina. Androutsos who was involved with the upcoming Greek War of Independence met on 1 September 1820 with Albanian commanders from Ali Pasha's court who had defected to the Ottomans – including Omer Vrioni, Ali Pasha's steward. He condemned their betrayal of Ali Pasha and after negotiations they all signed an agreement, which stipulated that in the upcoming revolt in Greece they would not send their troops against the rebels, but revolt in favor of Ali Pasha.

Greek Revolution

In May 1821, Omer Vrioni, now the commander of the Ottoman army, advanced with 8,000 men, after crushing the resistance of the Greeks at the river of Alamana and putting Athanasios Diakos to death, headed south into the Peloponnese to crush the Greek uprising.

Odysseas Androutsos with a band of 100 or so men took up a defensive position at an inn near Gravia, supported by Panourgias and Diovouniotis and their men. Vrioni attacked the inn but was repulsed with heavy casualties of over 300 dead. Finally, he was forced to ask for reinforcements and artillery, but the Greeks managed to slip out before the reinforcements arrived. Androutsos lost six men in the battle and earned the title of Commander in Chief of the Greek forces in Central Greece.

Androutsos sought to establish his power base in Attica and Euboea and sent his bands to the region in 1822. In April 1822, Androutsos, in cooperation with other revolutionary leaders, attempted to thwart Dramali’s expedition in Phthiotis. His plan failed, however, because the Greek Government did not provide him with the war supplies that he had requested. Androutsos’s failure in Phthiotis was used as a pretext by the Government to degrade him, and two other revolutionaries, Christos Palaskas and Alexios Noutsos, were sent to replace him. Palaskas was to relieve him of the military command and Noutsos was to take over the taxation apparatus, but Androutsos had both men killed. The regional assembly, fearing for their lives, fled to other areas and the army of Dramali passed through his area of command virtually untouched. In the consequent clash with his political opponent Ioannis Kolettis and the Areopagus of Eastern Continental Greece, he was accused of collaboration with the Ottomans and the government dismissed him from his commanding duties. However, he was soon restored and kept his command in Eastern Central Greece. In September 1822, at the insistence of the Athenian municipal authorities, Androutsos, Yannis Gouras, and Yannis Makriyannis took control of the Acropolis of Athens, which had been surrendered in June. To ensure the occupation he had a bastion built to protect the ancient Klepsydra spring, which had just been rediscovered by chance on the north-western slope of the rock. Androutsos made himself general-in-chief of Attica, and sent his men to plunder the wealthy villages of the region. 

In late 1822 Androutsos contacted the Ottomans and offered to sign a secret agreement under which he would recognize their authority if they gave him a hereditary title of armatoliki. Androutsos (referred to as Kapudan (Captain) Disava in Ottoman Archival Documents) explained his position in a letter to the Ottoman government in November 1822, where he presented the Greek revolt not as a national revolution, but as the result of social grievances which could be resolved if he was to be appointed to the right position. In his letters to the Greek chieftains and to the kodjabashis of Hydra, however, Androutsos claimed that the agreements made with the Ottomans were a ruse so that the revolutionaries would have time to transfer their people to more secure areas.  In a letter to Demetrios Ypsilantis, the president of the Greek Legislative Corps, Androutsos also reports that he attempted to lure the Ottomans under the command of Köse Mehmed Pasha into a trap, to no avail. Eventually, Odysseas Androutsos completely paralyzed  Köse Mehmed's operations in Central Greece.

Downfall
In early 1825, as the Greek Government still wanted to take the command and replace him, Androutsos, in anger, began a correspondence with Omer Pasha of Karystos, offering to hand over the Acropolis if aided by Ottoman troops and placed in control of the districts of Livadia, Thebes, and Atalanti. Though the terms of their agreement are not preserved in Ottoman archives, Androutsos was sent a firman granting him amnesty on 31 March. In the following days, the locals from Livadeia, Thebes, and Atalanti asked for amnesty from the court. He joined forces with the Ottoman army to defend the villages around Livadia. After promised reinforcements failed to arrive, he wanted to retreat towards Megara but was captured by Greek insurgents.

The provisional government accused Androutsos of collaboration with the Ottomans and imprisoned him in the Frankish Tower of the Acropolis of Athens. He was not given a trial due to the belief that his democratic character could turn the people against the government.

Once he was imprisoned, Androutsos was tortured and ultimately executed. The execution came at the order of Ioannis Gouras, who was once Androutsos' second in command. His execution took place on 5 June 1825 and was carried out by Ioannis Mamouris and two others. This treatment by Gouras is often viewed negatively. Androutsos' body was thrown from the Acropolis and was buried at its base on the north side.

Androutsos' sister Tersitsa married Edward John Trelawny, who had commanded Androutsos' forces in his absence.

Legacy

Androutsos is listed among the main Greek military figures and heroes of the Greek war of Independence. Some scholars described that at his last days he was seen as a traitor to the Greek cause. Among those who lived in the same period, Edward Trelawny who was married to his half-sister presents him as a noble figure, while Thomas Gordon calls him a "physically imposing man" who was "bloodthirsty, vindictive and as treacherous as an Arnaut" and "guilty of barbarious acts". Roessel says that through his connection with Trelawny, the traitor Androutsos became in England a hero of the Greek War of Independence. G. Finlay added that "his ambition was to ape the tyranny of Ali in a small sphere" and describes him also as "Odysseus, a partisan of Ali's". Finlay called Androutsos' agreement with the Ottomans "the most celebrated instance of treachery among the Greeks during their Revolution". Many klephts, such as Androutsos, fought only when it suited them. As a matter of policy, they also made temporary agreements with the enemy. This  was not considered treason to the infant Greek nation, because the notion of nationhood was not known to them. Long-lasting negotiations with the Ottomans, that were conducted by Androutsos and many other chieftains during the revolution, had benefited the Greek cause multiple times, since the negotiations were providing the revolutionaries enough time to rally troops and, later, fight and defeat their enemies in numerous engagements. 

Androutsos has been held up as a symbol of innate Greek values and freedom, in particular by the Greek left wing. 

In 1865, his body was recovered from the base of the Acropolis and given a proper funeral at the Metropolitan Cathedral of Athens. He was buried in the First Cemetery of Athens, where he remained for just over a century. On 15 July 1967, his bones were moved to an ossuary beneath a statue of himself in the central square of Preveza.

The soccer team of the town of Gravia, Odysseas Androutsos F.C. is named after him, as is the cultural association of his ancestral village of Livanates.

See also
Battle of Gravia Inn

References

Sources

1788 births
1825 deaths
Arvanites
Greek revolutionaries
Greek military leaders of the Greek War of Independence
People from Ithaca
Greek prisoners and detainees
Executed Greek people
Burials at the First Cemetery of Athens
People executed for treason against Greece